Russell Young may refer to:

 Russ Young (Russell Charles Young, 1902-1984), American baseball player
 Russell Young (tennis) (1902–1990), New Zealand tennis player, army officer, and corporate executive
 Russell Young (American football) (1912–?), American football and basketball coach
 Russell Young (artist) (born 1959), British-American artist

See also
John Russell "Russ" Young (1882-1966), American politician and journalist